Il bello, il brutto, il cretino, internationally known as The Handsome, the Ugly, and the Stupid is a 1967 Italian film directed by Giovanni Grimaldi starring the comic duo Franco and Ciccio. It is a Spaghetti Western parody of The Good, the Bad and the Ugly.

Plot summary
Bandits Franco and Ciccio, being unlucky in committing robberies, have an ingenious way to collect money: Ciccio is captured by the sheriffs' deputies, while Franco, enjoying the collected bounty, saves his friend just before he is hanged every time. But one day Franco is unable to save his friend, and he believes Ciccio lost forever. After getting drunk in a saloon, and also winning a lot of money playing poker, Franco magically meets Ciccio, who is not only not dead but also plans to take revenge on Franco. However, when he discovers with his friend the existence of a great treasure, buried out in the desert, the two renew their partnership.

Cast
Franco Franchi: Franco, the ugly
Ciccio Ingrassia: Ciccio Ingrassy, the stupid
Mimmo Palmara: the "Handsome"
Birgit Petri: Fabienne
Lothar Gunther: Cpt. Imbriatella 
Enzo Andronico: Prisoner 
Gino Buzzanca: Bookmaker
Bruno Scipioni

References

External links
 

1960s buddy comedy films
1960s parody films
1960s Western (genre) comedy films
1967 films
Films directed by Giovanni Grimaldi
1960s Italian-language films
Italian buddy comedy films
Italian parody films
Spaghetti Western films
Films scored by Lallo Gori
1967 comedy films
1960s Italian films